The MS Normandy was a ferry, last owned by the Singapore-based oil service company Equinox Offshore Accommodation, under charter to the Morocco-based ferry operator Ferrimaroc. She was built in 1981 by Götaverken, Gothenburg, Sweden, and first entered service in 1982 as MS Prinsessan Birgitta for Stena Sessan Line. She also served under the names MS St Nicholas and MS Stena Normandy.

Concept and construction
The ship latterly known as MS Normandy was originally ordered from Götaverken in the late 1970s by Sessan Linjen, Sweden, with a planned delivery date in late 1981. Before the ship was completed, Sessan Linjen's main rival Stena Line purchased the majority of shares in Sessan, leading to the formation of Stena Sessan Line. After Stena acquired Sessan they cancelled the order for the new ship, and the shipyard were forced to complete her on their own account. Temporarily named MS GV 909 and registered in Gothenburg, the ship was completed in December 1981 and subsequently laid up in Gothenburg.

Service history

1982-1983: Stena Line
In May 1982, Stena Sessan changed their mind and decided to purchase the GV 909 after all. The company wanted to name the ship Drottning Silvia in honour of Queen Silvia of Sweden, but the Royal Household of Sweden declined. Eventually the ship was named M/S Prinsessan Birgitta in honour Princess Birgitta, sister of King Carl XVI Gustav. Princess Brigitta herself christened the ship on 7 June 1982 (the ship had already entered traffic on 3 June). Prinsessan Birgittas service with Stena Sessan proved to be short, as she was chartered to Sealink in February 1983.

1983-1996: Sealink
Prior to entering service with Sealink, Prinsessan Birgitta was rebuilt at Götaverken with additional cabin facilities, renamed MS St Nicholas and registered under the flag of the United Kingdom, with London as her home port. In June 1983, she was set on Sealink's Hook of Holland—Harwich route. During the same month she was sold by Stena to Hill Samuel Trading Ltd, who continued chartering her to Sealink. In 1986 the ship was sold again, this time to a group of Stena subsidiaries. During the following two years she was sold three more times from one Stena subsidiary to another. None of these sales had any effect on her traffic, but in 1988 her home port was changed to Nassau, Bahamas.

In 1989, St Nicholas was sold again, this time to the Sweden-based Rederi AB Gotland, who continued to charter the ship to Sealink. In 1990 Stena Line took over the Sealink services and their former ship. In January 1991 St Nicholas was rebuilt at Lloyd Werft, Bremerhaven, Germany and renamed MS Stena Normandy. After briefly returning to the Hook of Holland—Harwich route, she was transferred to the Southampton—Cherbourg service in June 1991. She stayed on the service until November 1996 (her last passenger sailing for Stena being from Cherbourg to Southampton on 1 December), when her charter agreement to Stena expired and she was laid up in Dunkerque.

1997: Tallink
After being laid up for two months, Stena Normandy was chartered to Tallink, Estonia in January 1997 and renamed MS Normandy. She began service with Tallink on 23 April 1997, after being re-registered in Tallinn, Estonia. Her charter to Tallink ended on 30 December 1997, after which she reverted to Bahamian flag.

1998-2007: Irish Ferries
In January 1998 the Normandy was chartered to Irish Ferries and re-registered to Ireland. On 29 February 1998 she began service on their Rosslare—Pembroke Dock route, in April moving to Cork—Roscoff and Rosslare—Cherbourg services. In 1999 Rederi AB Gotland sold her to Irish Ferries and during the same year she was re-registered to Hamilton, Bermuda. Between January and March 2000 Normandy interiors were rebuilt at a Polish shipyard. During the same docking side sponsons were added on her hull for improved stability. Following the refit she was placed on Irish Ferries services from Ireland to France. In February 2004 the ship was out of traffic for four days due to a conflict between Irish Ferries and their employees on board. The same was repeated between 27 November and 14 December 2005. Following the delivery of the new MV Oscar Wilde, Normandy was taken out of service on 4 November 2007.

2008: Ferrimaroc
On 5 November 2007, the Normandy sailed from Rosslare to Fredericia, Denmark, where she was laid up until sold to the Singapore-based oil service company Equinox Offshore Accommodation on 28 January 2008. The new owners planned to rebuild her into an accommodation and repair vessel at SembCorp Marine shipyards, Singapore. However, instead of being rebuilt she was chartered to the Morocco-based Ferrimaroc in March 2008, entering service on the Almería—Nador route in April 2008.
She finally left the Mediterranean in the Autumn of 2008 and arrived in Singapore on 19 October  for her planned conversion.

2008-2012: Decline and Scrapping
The planned conversion of Normandy never happened, and the ship was abandoned by her last owners at a berth in Singapore. After this the condition of the ship declined rapidly with broken windows allowing flooding, mould and plants to take over the interior of the ship.

On 31 October 2012, Normandy left Singapore for India and was scrapped shortly after.

References

External links

Cruiseferries
Ships built in Gothenburg
1981 ships